Long-acting reversible contraceptives (LARC) are methods of birth control that provide effective contraception for an extended period without requiring user action. They include injections, intrauterine devices (IUDs), and subdermal contraceptive implants. They are the most effective reversible methods of contraception because their efficacy is not reliant on patient compliance. The typical use failure rates of IUDs and implants, less than 1% per year, are about the same as perfect use failure rates.

LARCS are convenient, enjoyable and cost effective. Typically, users save thousands of dollars over a five-year period compared to those who buy condoms and birth control pills. About 15.5% of women worldwide use IUDs, and 3.4% use subdermal implants.

LARCS are recommended to adolescents to decrease the teen pregnancy rate. They work in women of any age and number of births. Women may consider family planning advice beforehand.

Methods

LARC methods include IUDs and the subdermal implant:
 Hormonal intrauterine device (Mirena – also known as IUC or IUS)
 Nonhormonal intrauterine device with copper (US – ParaGard)
 Subdermal contraceptive implant (US – Nexplanon/Implanon/Implanon NXT; internationally – Norplant/Jadelle)
Some shorter-acting methods are sometimes considered LARC:
 Progestogen-only injectable contraceptive
 Combined injectable contraceptive

Medical use
The effectiveness of LARC methods has been shown to be superior to other types of birth control.
A study in 2012, with the largest cohort of IUD and implant users to date, found that the risk of contraceptive failure for those using oral contraceptive pills, the birth control patch, or the vaginal ring was 17 to 20 times higher than the risk for those using long-acting reversible contraception. For those under 21, who typically have lower adherence to drug regimens, the risk is twice as high as the risk among older participants. A statistically significant association has been observed in England between a decrease in teenage conception and increased LARC usage.

The discrepancy between LARC methods and other forms of birth control lies in the difference between "perfect use" and "typical use". Perfect use indicates complete adherence to medication schedules and guidelines. Typical use describes effectiveness in real-world conditions, where patients may not fully adhere to medication regimens. LARC methods require little to no user action after insertion; therefore, LARC perfect use failure rates are the same as their typical use failure rates.
LARC failure rates rival that of sterilization, but unlike sterilization LARC methods are reversible. Other reversible methods, such as oral contraceptive pills, the birth control patch, or the vaginal ring require daily, weekly, or monthly action by the user. While the perfect use failure rates of those methods may equal LARC methods, the typical use failure rates are significantly higher.
Even methods such as the DMPA injection require users to return to their provider every 12 weeks for the intramuscular shot or every 4 weeks for the subcutaneous shot. So, DMPA typical use failure rates are also higher than perfect use failure rates as more than 40% of women discontinue DMPA in the first year.
In both effectiveness and continuation, LARC methods are considered the first-line option for contraception.

Side effects
Contraceptive implants may cause irregular bleeding which some women find unacceptable as a side effect ("Irregular bleeding and spotting common in first 6 months" associated with IUS; similar to side effects observed with IUD, injection or implant. "Changes in bleeding pattern which are likely to remain irregular") or a complete cessation of menstrual flow (amenorrhea). Side effects that are observed less often may include emotional lability, weight gain, headache, and acne.

Side effects for LARC are mostly similar to combined and progesterone only oral contraceptives, with a possibility of a small change in mood or libido observed in IUD and IUS use. The risk of acne vulgaris may be higher in IUS users, but is an uncommon reason for stopping use. Weight gain has been observed with depot medroxyprogesterone acetate (Depo-Provera). IUDs present a slight risk of infection at the time of insertion but have a low risk of pelvic inflammatory disease (<1% for women at low risk of STIs), and uterine perforation (<1 in 1000). If a person becomes pregnant while they have an IUD inserted then the IUD should be removed within the first 12 weeks of gestation. In such a case, the mother has low risk of ectopic pregnancy – approximately 1 in 20. Women who cease using depot medroxyprogesterone acetate can find that they have a delay of up to a year before being able to get pregnant, while there is no evidence of a delay in IUD, IUS or implant users.

Society and culture

Cost and benefit
LARC methods traditionally have a higher up-front cost, between $800 and $900 in the United States, than methods such as pills, patches and vaginal rings, but are more cost-effective in the long run. Like all contraceptive methods, access to LARC methods can reduce the rate of unintended pregnancy and result in significant cost savings to publicly funded health systems. Women switching from short-acting reversible contraceptive to long-acting intrauterine systems are likely to generate cost savings from unplanned pregnancy-related expenses and long term savings in contraceptive costs. Regardless, the initial out of pocket cost is still too high for many patients and is one of the biggest barriers to LARC use. Two recent studies done in California and St. Louis have shown that rates of LARC usage are dramatically higher when the costs of the methods are either covered or removed. A program geared toward increasing use of LARC among adolescents in Iowa demonstrated a significant decrease in the unintended pregnancy and abortion rate in that state along with a projected savings of $17.23 for every dollar spent on contraception for 14- to 19-year-olds.

The Colorado Family Planning Initiative (CPFI), a six-year $23 million privately funded program to expand access to LARCs, decreased unplanned adolescent pregnancies in the state by about 40% and returned $5.85 in savings for each dollar spent. There was a similar decline of unplanned pregnancies in unmarried women under 25 who have not finished high school, another at risk group. Use of LARC methods by children of child-bearing age in the state increased to 20% during the 2009-2014 period.
A 2017 study found that CPFI "reduced the teen birth rate in counties with clinics receiving funding by 6.4 percent over five years. These effects were concentrated in the second through fifth years of the program and in counties with relatively high poverty rates."

Promotion

The United Kingdom Department of Health has actively promoted LARC use since 2008, particularly for young people; following on from the October 2005 National Institute for Health and Clinical Excellence guidelines, which promoted LARC provision in the United Kingdom, accurate and detailed counseling for women about these methods, and training of healthcare professionals to provide these methods. Giving advice on these methods of contraception has been included in the 2009 Quality and Outcomes Framework "good practice" for primary care.

The use of long-acting reversible contraceptives in the United States has increased nearly fivefold from 1.5% in 2002 to 7.2% in 2011–2013. Increasing access to long-acting reversible contraceptives was listed by the Centers for Disease Control and Prevention as one of the top public health priorities for reducing teen pregnancy and unintended pregnancy in the United States. One study of female family planning providers showed that they were significantly more likely to use LARCs than the general population (41.7% compared to 12.0%) suggesting that the general population has less information or access to LARCs.

Guidelines released in 2009 by the American Congress of Obstetricians and Gynecologists state that LARC methods are considered to be the first-line option for birth control in the United States, and are recommended for the majority of women.
According to the CDC Medical Eligibility Criteria for Contraceptive Use, LARC methods are recommended for the majority of women who have had their first menstruation, regardless of whether they have had any pregnancies. The American Academy of Pediatrics (AAP) in a policy statement and technical report published in October 2014 recommended LARC methods for adolescents.

References

External links
 UK National Health Service Long-acting Reversible Contraception Guidelines
 Long-acting reversible contraception: the effective and appropriate use of long-acting reversible contraception
 Increasing Use of Contraceptive Implants and Intrauterine Devices To Reduce Unintended Pregnancy from the American Congress of Obstetricians and Gynecologists

Methods of birth control